The 2014 VTV Cup Championship was the 11th staging of the international tournament. The tournament was held in Bắc Ninh, Vietnam.

Pools composition

 (Host)

 Yunnan

Preliminary round
Note: The qualification norm used in this tournament is different from FIVB international standard which looks at Set ratio before Point ratio. The host Vietnam uses Point ratio instead of Set Ratio.

Final round

Bracket

Semifinals

5th place

3rd place

Final

Final standing

Awards
MVP:  Nguyễn Thị Ngọc Hoa
Best Spiker:  Ajcharaporn Kongyot
Best Blocker:  Bui Thi Nga
Best Setter:  Min Ok Ju
Best Server:  Jong Jin Sim
Best Digger:  Tikamporn Changkeaw
Best Libero:  Nguyen Thi Kim Lien
Miss You VTV Eximbank Cup 2014:  Le Thanh Thuy

References

External links 
 Thailand stun hosts Vietnam on first day of VTV Cup, AsianVolleyBall.org.

VTV International Women's Volleyball Cup
VTV
VTV